Cantonese slang is a type of slang used in areas where the Cantonese language is spoken. It is commonly spoken in Guangdong, Guangxi, Macao and Hong Kong.

History

As ties with Hong Kong and Mainland China increased, usage of Cantonese slang and adaptations of Cantonese slang into other Chinese dialects increased within the Mainland. This allows easier communication between the people.

Usage
Linda Chiu-han Lai, author of "Film and Enigmatization," said that it is not possible to translate Cantonese slang, like how slang in other languages cannot be translated.

Wong Man Tat Parco wrote a thesis on the usage of Cantonese slang by young people in Hong Kong. He said "[i]n terms of the frequency of slang use, the present research findings suggest that females are by no means passive slang users nowadays. Therefore the traditional belief that males are slang dominators and females slang eschewers... does not hold true at present time any longer."

Types of slang

"Triad language" is a type of Cantonese slang. It is censored out of television and films, and triad language. Kingsley Bolton and Christopher Hutton, the authors of "Bad Boys and Bad Language: Chòu háu and the Sociolinguistics of Swear Words in Cantonese," said that regardless of official discouragement of the use of triad language, "[T]riad language or triad-associated language is an important source of innovation in Hong Kong Cantonese."

Chòu háu (粗口, Jyutping: cou1 hau2, Mandarin Pinyin: Cūkǒu, Lit: Coarse Mouth) refers to sexually explicit taboo words. In Hong Kong print media, feature films, and television, such words are censored. Bolton and Hutton said "[t]he use of chòu háu is often seen as a marker of criminality of triad-membership, and official agencies tend to view the spread of chòu háu into the mainstream of Hong Kong society and its media as indicating a general crisis, as being symptomatic of a rising tide of social disorder and alienation."

Two way of talking in Cantonese slang is "Moh lei tau." Chow Sing Chi, a comedy actor, started the slang in the 1990s. "Moh lei tau" became popular with younger people and secondary school students, and the groups began to use it. The slang made Chow well-known and financially prosperous. Some prominent members of Hong Kong society believed that the slang was lowering the quality of the language and asked youth to stop using it. Sue Wright, author of One Country, Two Systems, Three Languages: A Survey of Changing Language Use in Hong Kong, said in 1997 that "The rage is over now; the role of television in starting it remains indisputable."

Attitudes towards slang

The authorities in Hong Kong monitor film and television for slang, removing what is considered to be inappropriate. Kingsley Bolton and Christopher Hutton, the authors of "Bad Boys and Bad Language: Chòu háu and the Sociolinguistics of Swear Words in Cantonese," said that Hong Kong authorities have far less tolerance of vulgar words than in western societies such as the United Kingdom and that aspect is "seems to distinguish the situation" in Hong Kong.

Slang terms

Many slang terms in Hong Kong are used to refer to minority groups, including:
 gweilo (鬼佬; literally "ghost man") - means foreigners (mainly US and UK).
 bak gwei (白鬼; literally "white ghost") - means white people. 
 hak gwei (黑鬼; literally "black ghost") - means black people.
 ga jai (㗎仔) [male],  ga mui (㗎妹) [female] and lo baat tau (蘿白頭; literally radish head) - means Japanese people.
 bun mui (賓妹) [female], bun jai (賓仔) [male] - means Filipina/Filipino domestic employees.
 ah cha (阿差) or ah sing (阿星) - meanss Indian and Pakistani people.

Significance of slang
Linda Chiu-han Lai, author of "Film and Enigmatization," said that "The power of Cantonese slang is instantaneously differentiating at the moment of utterance: it distinguishes not only Cantonese from Mandarin speakers, but also Cantonese speakers in Hong Kong from those who live in places like Singapore, Malaysia, Canton, Canada, and so on—part of the Cantonese diaspora."

See also

 Chinese slang
 Cantonese profanity
 Diu (Cantonese)
 Hong Kong slang
 Cantonese internet slang

References
 Adams, Michael. Slang: The People's Poetry. Oxford University Press, 2009. , 9780195314632.
 Bolton, Kingsley and Christopher Hutton. "Bad Boys and Bad Language: Chòu háu and the Sociolinguistics of Swear Words in Cantonese." In: Evans, Grant and Maria Tam Siu-mi (editors). Hong Kong: The Anthropology of a Chinese Metropolis. University of Hawaii Press, 1997. , 9780824820053.
 Hsing, You-Tien. Making Capitalism in China: The Taiwan Connection. Oxford University Press, 1998. , 9780195103243.
 Lai, Linda Chiu-han. "Chapter Ten: Film and Enigmatization: Nostalgia, Nonsense, and Remembering." in Yau, Esther Ching-Mei. At Full Speed: Hong Kong Cinema in a Borderless World. University of Minnesota Press, 2001. , 9780816632350.
 Lo, Kwai-Cheung. "Invisible Neighbors: Racial Minorities and the Hong Kong Chinese Community." In: Kerr, Douglas. Critical Zone 3: A Forum of Chinese and Western Knowledge. Hong Kong University Press, April 30, 2009. , 9789622098572.
 Wright, Sue. One Country, Two Systems, Three Languages: A Survey of Changing Language Use in Hong Kong. Multilingual Matters, 1997. , 9781853593963.

Notes

Further reading
 Christopher Hutton, Kingsley Bolton. A Dictionary of Cantonese Slang: The language of Hong Kong M, Street Gangs and City Life. Hurst & Company, January 1, 2006. , 9781850654193.

Cantonese words and phrases
Slang by language